The 2018–19 Loyola Marymount Lions women's basketball team represents Loyola Marymount University in the 2018–19 NCAA Division I women's basketball season. The Lions, led by seventh year head coach Charity Elliott, play their homes games at the Gersten Pavilion and were members of the West Coast Conference. They finished the season 18–15, 10–8 in WCC play to finish in a tie for fifth place. They advanced to the quarterfinals of the WCC women's tournament where they lost to Saint Mary's. They received an at-large bid to the WNIT which was their first postseason tournament since 2004, where they lost to Idaho in the first round.

Roster

Schedule

|-
!colspan=12 style=| Exhibition

|-
!colspan=12 style=| Non-conference regular season

|-
!colspan=12 style=| WCC regular season

|-
!colspan=12 style=| WCC Women's Tournament

|-
!colspan=12 style=| WNIT

See also
 2018–19 Loyola Marymount Lions men's basketball team

References

Loyola Marymount Lions women's basketball seasons
Loyola Marymount
Loyola Marymount basketball, women
Loyola Marymount basketball, women
Loyola Marymount basketball, women
Loyola Marymount basketball, women
Loyola